Oleksandr Viktorovych Noyok (born 15 May 1992) is a Ukrainian professional footballer who plays as a midfielder.

Career
He is product of FC Shakhtar Donetsk sportive school. Noyok was loaned to FC Zakarpattia Uzhhorod in Ukrainian First League from 15 July 2010.

Noyok signed with FC Metalist in the Ukrainian Premier League in April 2013. After being loaned to Metalurh Donetsk for 22 games, he signed with Dinamo Minsk on 11 March 2016.

Honours
Dynamo Brest
 Belarusian Premier League: 2019
 Belarusian Super Cup: 2019, 2020

Apollon Limassol
 Cypriot First Division: 2021–22

References

External links 
 
 
 

1992 births
Living people
Sportspeople from Kherson
Ukrainian Romani people
Romani footballers
Ukrainian footballers
Association football midfielders
Ukraine youth international footballers
Ukraine under-21 international footballers
FC Shakhtar Donetsk players
FC Shakhtar-3 Donetsk players
FC Hoverla Uzhhorod players
FC Metalist Kharkiv players
FC Metalurh Donetsk players
FC Dinamo Minsk players
FC Dynamo Brest players
FC Orenburg players
FC Rukh Brest players
Apollon Limassol FC players
Maccabi Bnei Reineh F.C. players
FC Atyrau players
Ukrainian Premier League players
Ukrainian First League players
Ukrainian Second League players
Belarusian Premier League players
Russian First League players
Cypriot First Division players
Israeli Premier League players
Kazakhstan Premier League players
Ukrainian expatriate footballers
Expatriate footballers in Belarus
Expatriate footballers in Russia
Expatriate footballers in Cyprus
Expatriate footballers in Israel
Expatriate footballers in Kazakhstan
Ukrainian expatriate sportspeople in Belarus
Ukrainian expatriate sportspeople in Russia
Ukrainian expatriate sportspeople in Cyprus
Ukrainian expatriate sportspeople in Israel
Ukrainian expatriate sportspeople in Kazakhstan